Le Tombeau de Couperin (The Grave of Couperin) is a suite for solo piano by Maurice Ravel, composed between 1914 and 1917. The piece is in six movements, based on those of a traditional Baroque suite. Each movement is dedicated to the memory of a friend of the composer (or in one case, two brothers) who had died fighting in World War I. Ravel also produced an orchestral version of the work in 1919, although this omitted two of the original movements.

Overview
The word tombeau in the title is a musical term popular from the 17th century, meaning "a piece written as a memorial". The specific Couperin, among a family noted as musicians for about two centuries, that Ravel intended to evoke is thought to be François Couperin "the Great" (1668–1733).  Ravel stated that his intention was to pay homage more generally to the sensibilities of the Baroque French keyboard suite, not necessarily to imitate or pay tribute to Couperin himself in particular. This is reflected in the piece's structure, which imitates a Baroque dance suite.

As a preparatory exercise, Ravel had transcribed a forlane (an Italian folk dance) from the fourth suite of Couperin's Concerts royaux, and this piece invokes Ravel's Forlane structurally. The other movements are similarly based on Baroque forms, with the Toccata taking the form of a perpetuum mobile reminiscent of Alessandro Scarlatti. Ravel also revives Baroque practices through his distinctive use of ornamentation and modal harmony. Neoclassicism also shines through with Ravel's pointedly twentieth-century chromatic melody and piquant harmonies, particularly in the dissonant Forlane.

Written after the death of Ravel's mother in 1917 and of friends in the First World War, Le Tombeau de Couperin is a light-hearted, and sometimes reflective work rather than a sombre one which Ravel explained in response to criticism saying: "The dead are sad enough, in their eternal silence."

The first performance of the original piano version was given on 11 April 1919 by Marguerite Long, in the Salle Gaveau in Paris. Long was the widow of Joseph de Marliave, to whom the last movement of the piece, the Toccata, is dedicated.

Composition
The movements are as follows:

Orchestrations and transcriptions

In 1919 Ravel orchestrated four movements of the work (Prélude, Forlane, Menuet and Rigaudon); this version was premiered in February 1920 by Rhené-Baton and the Pasdeloup Orchestra, and has remained one of his more popular works. The orchestral version clarifies the harmonic language of the suite and brings sharpness to its classical dance rhythms. The oboe features prominently, taking the melody in the Prélude and the Menuet, as well as for the pastoral C minor section of the Rigaudon, where it is accompanied by guitar-like pizzicati.

The orchestrated version is scored for two flutes (one doubling piccolo), two oboes (one doubling cor anglais), two clarinets, two bassoons, two horns, trumpet, harp, and strings.

Only a few years after Ravel's own orchestration, Lucien Garban (working under the pseudonym of Roger Branga) produced a version of the piece for 'small orchestra' with a piano-conductor, consisting of the Prélude, Menuet and Rigaudon. He had previously transcribed the full suite for piano four hands in 1919.

Several other composers have since created orchestrations of those two movements which Ravel omitted, the Fugue and the Toccata. David Diamond orchestrated the second movement Fugue, while the Hungarian pianist and conductor Zoltán Kocsis produced his own version of both the Fugue and the Toccata. However, here, the Toccata, scored for a very large orchestra, goes far beyond the limits of Ravel's own, small orchestra, and the Fugue is set for winds only. Another instrumentation of Fugue and Toccata by pianist Michael Round was recorded by Vladimir Ashkenazy (Exton, 2003): the score is published (as two separate titles, 'Fugue' and 'Toccata') by Edwin F. Kalmus. Round's version of the Toccata adds percussion, requiring up to five players. Kalmus omitted the percussion parts from the published score so as to exactly match the orchestration of the rest of the suite, but these parts are available separately, directly from the orchestrator. In 2013 the British composer Kenneth Hesketh orchestrated the Fugue and Toccata for the exact orchestration of the original four-movement orchestral suite. The first performance was given by the Goettingen Symphony Orchestra conducted by Christoph-Mathias Mueller. The scores are available from Schott Music, London. 

Four movements (Prélude, Forlane, Menuet, and Rigaudon) have been arranged for wind quintet by American horn player Mason Jones (1919–2009). Danish composer Hans Abrahamsen has also transcribed four movements for wind quintet, and further, American composer Gunther Schuller has made a wind-quintet arrangement.

In 1986 an orchestration of the Prélude was created by Michel Colombier for Branford Marsalis on his album Romances for Saxophone. Marsalis played the melody with a soprano saxophone.

In 2013, Trevor P. Wagler re-arranged the orchestral version of four movements (Prélude, Forlane, Menuet, and Rigaudon) down to a quintet (ob/cl/vn/vcl/pft), premiered at Wilfrid Laurier University.

The four orchestral movements (Prélude, Forlane, Menuet and Rigaudon) were arranged by Elena González Arias (Adliswil: Ed.Kunzelmann, 2014) for oboe and piano in 2014.

References

External links

Le Tombeau de Couperin - free complete recording at The Piano Society
Le Tombeau de Couperin at maurice-ravel.net
Listen to Toccata from Le Tombeau de Couperin orchestrated by Kenneth Hesketh
Youtube: Orchestration of the Fugue and Toccata by Jack M. Jarrett (1982)
Youtube: Jazz arrangement of the Prelude by Tamir Hendelman (piano), Marco Panascia (bass), Lewis Nash (drums) (2010)

Suites by Maurice Ravel
Compositions for solo piano
Compositions for symphony orchestra
1917 compositions
1919 compositions
Funerary and memorial compositions
Orchestral suites
Music with dedications
Neoclassicism (music)